D513 was a state road in Croatia that had connected Ploče and the D62 state road near Mali Prolog.

In 2010, this road was defined in the Croatian Government's "Decision on categorization of public roads as state roads, county roads and local roads".

After the more modern D425 road was completed, the D513 is no longer classified as such.

The road, as well as all other state roads in Croatia, was managed and maintained by Hrvatske ceste, state owned company.

Traffic volume 

Traffic was regularly counted and reported by Hrvatske ceste, operator of the road. Substantial variations between annual (AADT) and summer (ASDT) traffic volumes are attributed to the fact that the road served as a connection to the A1 motorway and the D8 state road carrying substantial tourist traffic.

Road junctions and populated areas

Sources

See also
 State roads in Croatia
 Hrvatske ceste

State roads in Croatia
Transport in Dubrovnik-Neretva County